Harisree College is located in Anakkara, Palakkad Dist. 679551. Kerala, India. It was established in 1992 at Anakkara and has branches in Kumaranellur & Kalladathur (nearby G.G.H.S. Kumaranellur also).

Colleges in Kerala
Universities and colleges in Palakkad district
Educational institutions established in 1992
1992 establishments in Kerala